San Vicente de León is a town in the Arenas de Iguña municipality of the Spanish region of Cantabria.

References
Cantabria 102 Municipios 

Towns in Spain